Kennedy House or Kennedy Farm or Kennedy Cottage or Kennedy Mansion may refer to:

(by state, then city/town)

Kennedy House (Abbeville, Alabama), listed on the National Register of Historic Places (NRHP) in Henry County, Alabama
Kennedy House (Mobile, Alabama) — home of Joshua Kennedy and later the Merchant Navy Club of the Seamen's Church Institute of Mobile
Dr. Walter Kennedy House, Sarasota, Florida, NRHP-listed
Brown–Kennedy House, Carnesville, Georgia, listed on the NRHP in Franklin County, Georgia
Archibald M. Kennedy House, Rushville, Indiana, listed on the NRHP in Rush County, Indiana
Joseph Kennedy House, Shawhan, Kentucky, listed on the NRHP in Bourbon County, Kentucky
Yenowine–Kennedy House, Jeffersontown, Kentucky, listed on the NRHP in Jefferson County, Kentucky 
Matthew Kennedy House, Lexington, Kentucky, listed on the NRHP in Fayette County, Kentucky
Thomas Kennedy House (Carlisle, Kentucky), listed on the National Register of Historic Places in Nicholas County, Kentucky
Thomas Kennedy House (Paris, Kentucky), listed on the National Register of Historic Places in Bourbon County, Kentucky
Kennedy–Hunsinger Farm, Jeffersontown and Louisville, Kentucky, listed on the NRHP in Jefferson County, Kentucky
Kennedy Farm, Samples Manor, Maryland, a National Historic Landmark
John Fitzgerald Kennedy National Historic Site, Brookline, Massachusetts, NRHP-listed
Kennedy Compound, Hyannis Port, Massachusetts, NRHP-listed
Frederick A. Kennedy Jr. and Caroline Hewett, Farm, Hanover, Michigan, listed on the NRHP in Jackson County, Michigan
Kennedy Hill Farm, Goffstown, New Hampshire, NRHP-listed
Kennedy–Martin–Stelle Farmstead, Bernards Township, New Jersey, NRHP-listed
Kennedy House and Mill, Kennedy Mills, New Jersey, NRHP-listed
Hipp–Kennedy House, Penfield, New York, NRHP-listed
Kennedy Cottage (Saranac Lake, New York), NRHP-listed
Bruce–Dowd–Kennedy House, Carthage, North Carolina, listed on the NRHP in Moore County, North Carolina
Kennedy Apartments and Commercial Block, Cleveland, Ohio, listed on the NRHP in Cleveland, Ohio
Kennedy Stone House, North Salem, Ohio, NRHP-listed
Kennedy Mansion (Okmulgee, Oklahoma), on the National Register of Historic Places listings in Okmulgee County, Oklahoma
Kennedy Mansion (Valley Forge), Port Kennedy, Pennsylvania, listed on the NRHP in Montgomery County, Pennsylvania
Francis W. Kennedy House, West Whiteland, Pennsylvania, NRHP-listed
C. B. Kennedy Mansion, Canton, South Dakota, listed on the NRHP in Lincoln County, South Dakota
James Kennedy House, Columbia, Tennessee, listed on the NRHP in Maury County, Tennessee
Thomas P. Kennedy Jr. House, Forest Hills, Tennessee, listed on the NRHP in Davidson County, Tennessee
Marshall W. Kennedy House, Houston, Texas, listed on the NRHP in Harris County, Texas
R. A. Kennedy–J. M. Lowrey House, Lufkin, Texas, listed on the NRHP in Angelina County, Texas
A. C. Kennedy–Runnells House, Lufkin, Texas, listed on the NRHP in Angelina County, Texas
Kennedy–Lunsford Farm, Raphine, Virginia, NRHP-listed

See also
Thomas Kennedy House (disambiguation)
Kennedy Building (disambiguation)
Kennedy family